Chen Li-an (born 22 June 1937 in Qingtian, Zhejiang, Republic of China), sometimes spelled Chen Lu-an, is an electrical engineer, mathematician and former Taiwanese politician. He was the President of the Control Yuan from 1993 to 1995.

While he still considered the Kuomintang a "rotten party", Chen endorsed the KMT candidate Lien Chan in the 2000 ROC presidential election, believing that Lien was unlike the rest of the Kuomintang.

In January 2001, Chen re-joined the Kuomintang, because he thought both the party and Taiwan needed him.

See also
Politics of the Republic of China

References

|-

|-

1937 births
Living people
Affiliated Senior High School of National Taiwan Normal University alumni
Courant Institute of Mathematical Sciences alumni
Politicians from Lishui
Kuomintang politicians in Taiwan
Tibetan Buddhists from Taiwan
Republic of China politicians from Zhejiang
Taiwanese Presidents of the Control Yuan
Taiwanese Ministers of Economic Affairs
Taiwanese Ministers of National Defense
Independent presidential candidates of Taiwan
Taiwanese people from Zhejiang
Ministers of Science and Technology of the Republic of China
People from Qingtian County
Presidents of universities and colleges in Taiwan